The genus Pholisma (Nutt. ex Hook.) consists of three to five species of desert-dwelling, primarily subterranean plants.

Most notable of the genus is Pholisma sonorae, native to the Southwestern United States and Mexico. The species is without chlorophyll and lives as a parasite on the roots of a number of desert species. Pholisma belongs to the family Boraginaceae. Other species include Pholisma arenarium, the "desert Christmas tree".

References

External links
The Botanical Society of America
Jepson Manual Treatment

 
Parasitic plants
Boraginaceae genera